The 2012 Malaysia FA Cup Final was a football match which was played on 19 May 2012, to determine the champion of the 2012 Malaysia FA Cup. It was the final of the 23rd edition of the Malaysia FA Cup, competition organised by the Football Association of Malaysia.

The final was played between Sime Darby and Kelantan. Kelantan has won their first Malaysia FA Cup title, after winning the match 1–0.

Venue
The final was held at the National Stadium, Bukit Jalil in Kuala Lumpur.

Road to final

Match details

References

External links
FAM Official website

Final
2012 in Malaysian football